Éamonn Oliver Walsh BA, STL, BL (born 1 September 1944) is an Irish Catholic bishop and is one of the two Emeritus Auxiliary Bishops of Dublin, the other being Raymond W. Field.

From Celbridge, Co. Kildare,  Dr. Walsh, studied for the priesthood at Clonliffe College and at the Lateran University. He received a BA Degree in Philosophy and a Licence in Theology. He is also a qualified Barrister-at-Law.
He was ordained a priest for the diocese of Dublin on 13 April 1969. He served as a secretary to Archbishop Kevin McNamara during his tenure as Archbishop of Dublin. He served as Dean of Clonliffe College from 1977 to 1985.
On 7 March 1990 Pope John Paul II appointed Walsh as Auxiliary Bishop of Dublin and Titular Bishop of Elmhama. He was ordained bishop on 22 April with Archbishop Desmond Connell as consecrator and Apostolic Nuncio to Ireland Archbishop Emanuele Gerada and Bishop James Kavanagh as principal co-consecrators.

After the publication of the 2009 Murphy Report into child abuse in the Dublin Diocese, Bishop Walsh said in an interview:

Resignation

As an auxiliary bishop and secretary to Archbishop McNamara, Walsh was interviewed in the Murphy Report investigations. The Report refers to one particular allegation in one instance where he advised a woman to write to the chancellor, and he was subsequently asked: "Did you report that to the Garda?" He replied: "... it took about six months for the woman to actually get the name of the complainant and you can't go to the guards with a third-party concern. So the spin that was put on that yesterday morning (in an article in The Irish Times by One in Four founder Colm O'Gorman) was most disingenuous and outrageous."

Bishop Walsh and Bishop Ray Field offered an apology to child-abuse victims as they announced their resignations during Christmas Midnight Mass on 24 December 2009. There are therefore no currently active Auxiliary Bishops to assist Archbishop Martin. This is in addition to this month of two other bishops, Donal Murray of Limerick and James Moriarty of Kildare, who have also resigned following the publication on 26 November of a three-year investigation into why so many abusive Dublin priests escaped justice for so long.

In a joint statement, Walsh and Field said they hoped their resignations "may help to bring the peace and reconciliation of Jesus Christ to the victims (and) survivors of child sexual abuse. We again apologise to them". Archbishop Diarmuid Martin had called for his two auxiliary bishops to quit , but both initially refused. In his Christmas sermon, Martin said the church for too long placed its self-interest above the rights of its parishioners, particularly innocent children. He said they, as well as the dedicated majority of priests, had been betrayed by their leaders. "It has been a painful year," he told worshippers at St Mary's pro-Cathedral in Dublin. "But the church today may well be a better and safer place than was the church of 25 years ago – when all looked well, but where deep shadows were kept buried."

In their joint resignation speech, they said they had that "evening informed Archbishop Diarmuid Martin that we are offering our resignation to His Holiness, Pope Benedict XVI, as Auxiliary Bishops to the Archbishop of Dublin. As we celebrate the Feast of Christmas, the Birth of our Saviour, the Prince of Peace, it is our hope that our action may help to bring the peace and reconciliation of Jesus Christ to the victims/survivors of child sexual abuse. We again apologise to them. Our thoughts and prayers are with those who have so bravely spoken out and those who continue to suffer in silence."

Return to ministry and retirement
On 11 August 2010, it was announced that Pope Benedict XVI did not accept Bishop Walsh's resignation and that he would return to ministry within the archdiocese along with Bishop Raymond Field. He retired on 30 September 2019, at the age of 75.

See also
Murphy Report
Ryan Report

References 

1944 births
Living people
20th-century Roman Catholic bishops in Ireland
21st-century Roman Catholic titular bishops
20th-century Roman Catholic titular bishops
Alumni of Clonliffe College
Catholic Church sexual abuse scandals in Ireland
Auxiliary bishops of the Roman Catholic Archdiocese of Dublin
Ecclesiastical passivity to Catholic sexual abuse cases
21st-century Roman Catholic bishops in Ireland